Hisua is an Assembly constituency of the Legislative Assembly of Bihar covering the city of Hisua in the Nawada district of Bihar, India.

Hisua is one of six assembly constituencies in the Nawada (Lok Sabha constituency). Since 2008, this assembly constituency is numbered 236 amongst 243 constituencies.

Currently this seat belongs to Indian National Congress candidate Nitu Kumari, who won in last Assembly election of 2020 Bihar Legislative Assembly election by defeating Bharatiya Janta Party candidate Anil Singh by a margin of 17,091 votes.

Geographical scope
The constituency comprises parts of below areas:
 Akbarpur Block
 Hisua Block
 Narhat Block

Members of the Legislative Assembly

Election results

2020

References

External links
 

Assembly constituencies of Bihar